Sierra Cristal National Park is a national park in Cuba. It is located in the municipalities of Mayarí and Sagua de Tánamo in southern Holguín Province.

Overview
It is located in the heights of Sierra Cristal (Cristal Mountains), one of the highest mountain range in Cuba (second only to Sierra Maestra).

Conservation
The ranges are dominated by pine forests. The endangered Cuban solenodon (Solenodon cubanus) can be found in Sierra Cristal.

A research center established in 1988 in Pinares de Mayarí monitors the ecology of the region.

See also
Nipe-Sagua-Baracoa

References

National parks of Cuba
Mountains of Cuba
Geography of Holguín Province
Mayarí
Protected areas established in 1930
1930 establishments in Cuba
Tourist attractions in Holguín Province